John Hew North Gustav Henry Hamilton-Dalrymple, 11th Earl of Stair (12 June 1848 – 2 December 1914), known as Viscount Dalrymple 1864-1903, was a British army officer and nobleman.

Family
Hamilton-Dalrymple was the son of John Hamilton Dalrymple, 10th Earl of Stair and his wife, Louisa Jane Henrietta Emily de Franquetot. He married Susan Harriet Grant-Suttie, daughter of Sir James Grant-Suttie, 6th Bt. and Lady Susan Harriet Innes-Ker, on 10 April 1878; they were divorced in 1905.
There were two children of the marriage:
Lady Beatrice Susan Dalrymple (died 10 May 1962) married 1905 (divorced 1922) Archibald Montgomerie, 16th Earl of Eglinton, and had issue
John James Dalrymple, 12th Earl of Stair (b. 1 February 1879 - d. 4 November 1961)

Career
Lord Stair was a captain of the Ayrshire (Earl of Carrick's Own) Yeomanry, and was promoted to major on 4 March 1902. He was granted the honorary rank of lieutenant-colonel on 2 August 1902.

In 1912 he became President of the influential Scottish conservationist group the Cockburn Association, relinquishing the position the following year. His son John would go on to become President of the group in 1932.

Death
Lord Stair died on 2 December 1914, aged 66.

External links
Peerage.com biodata

Sources

Burke's Peerage, Baronetage & Knightage, 107th edition, 3 volumes (Wilmington, Delaware, U.S.A.: Burke's Peerage (Genealogical Books) Ltd, 2003), volume 1, page 1284.

1848 births
1914 deaths
Earls of Stair
Ayrshire (Earl of Carrick's Own) Yeomanry officers
Presidents of the Royal Scottish Geographical Society